Thomas de Lacy (1773–1844) was a 19th-century Anglican priest in Ireland.

He was born in County Dublin and educated at Trinity College, Dublin. He was Rector of  Kilskeer; and archdeacon of Meath from 1799 until his death on 8 February 1844.

References

1844 deaths
Alumni of Trinity College Dublin
18th-century Irish Anglican priests
19th-century Irish Anglican priests
1773 births
Archdeacons of Meath